Dunes City is a city in Lane County, Oregon, United States. The population was 1,303 at the 2010 census.

Geography 

Demographics

2010 census
As of the census of 2010, there were 1,303 people, 609 households, and 407 families living in the city. The racial makeup of the city was 95.4% White, 0.2% African American, 0.7% Native American, 0.7% Asian, 0.1% Pacific Islander, 0.4% from other races, and 2.5% from two or more races. Hispanic or Latino of any race were 1.7% of the population.

There were 609 households, of which 16.3% had children under the age of 18 living with them, 58.1% were married couples living together, 5.4% had a female householder with no husband present, 3.3% had a male householder with no wife present, and 33.2% were non-families. 25.1% of all households were made up of individuals, and 15.6% had someone living alone who was 65 years of age or older. The average household size was 2.14 and the average family size was 2.51.

The median age in the city was 59.4 years. 13.4% of residents were under the age of 18; 3.2% were between the ages of 18 and 24; 10.9% were from 25 to 44; 37% were from 45 to 64; and 35.5% were 65 years of age or older. The gender makeup of the city was 50.5% male and 49.5% female.

2000 census
At the 2000 census, there were 1,241 people, 558 households and 414 families living in the city. The population density was 463.3 per square mile (178.8/km). There were 705 housing units at an average density of 263.2 per square mile (101.6/km). The racial makeup of the city was 97.02% White, 0.08% African American, 1.37% Native American, 0.48% Asian, 0.08% Pacific Islander, 0.08% from other races, and 0.89% from two or more races. Hispanic or Latino of any race were 1.21% of the population.

There were 558 households, of which 18.3% had children under the age of 18 living with them, 67.6% were married couples living together, 5.2% had a female householder with no husband present, and 25.8% were non-families. 21.1% of all households were made up of individuals, and 10.0% had someone living alone who was 65 years of age or older. The average household size was 2.22 and the average family size was 2.55.

Age distribution was 16.8% under the age of 18, 2.6% from 18 to 24, 16.1% from 25 to 44, 37.1% from 45 to 64, and 27.3% who were 65 years of age or older. The median age was 53 years. For every 100 females, there were 97.0 males. For every 100 females age 18 and over, there were 91.5 males.

The median household income city was $39,100, and the median family income was $47,574. Males had a median income of $34,167 versus $25,417 for females. The per capita income for the city was $27,048, about 8.5% of families and 10.6% of the population were below the poverty line, including 17.5% of those under age 18 and 7.6% of those age 65 or over.

References

External links 

 Entry for Dunes City in the Oregon Blue Book

Cities in Oregon
Populated coastal places in Oregon
Cities in Lane County, Oregon
1963 establishments in Oregon